Dioon spinulosum, giant dioon, or gum palm, is a cycad endemic to limestone cliffs and rocky hillsides in the tropical rainforests of Veracruz and Oaxaca, Mexico.  It is one of the tallest cycads in the world, growing to 12m in height.  The tree is found at low elevations to 300 m above sea level.

Dioon spinulosum prefers well-drained soil with regular water. It will grow in soils containing few nutrients, in soils rich in limestone, and on slopes. It is hardy to USDA Zones 9B – 11.

Dioon spinulosum has pinnate leaves that grow to about 5–7 ft (1.5-2.1 m) in length and radiate out from the trunk. The 120-240 leaflets on each leaf are small and flat, have small thorns and taper to a sharp point.

References

External links
Encyclopædia Britannica Giant dioon.
Michigan State University Horticulture .

spinulosum
Data deficient plants